Ruperta Charles (born 25 August 1962) is an Antigua and Barbuda sprinter. She competed in the women's 100 metres at the 1984 Summer Olympics.

References

External links
 

1962 births
Living people
Athletes (track and field) at the 1983 Pan American Games
Athletes (track and field) at the 1984 Summer Olympics
Antigua and Barbuda female sprinters
Olympic athletes of Antigua and Barbuda
Place of birth missing (living people)
Pan American Games competitors for Antigua and Barbuda
Olympic female sprinters